Wild Archaeology is a Canadian documentary television series, which premiered in 2016 on the Aboriginal Peoples Television Network. The series profiles various archaeological projects to investigate and recover the ancient history of the indigenous peoples of Canada.

The series received a Canadian Screen Award nomination for Best Factual Program or Series at the 9th Canadian Screen Awards in 2021.

References

External links

2016 Canadian television series debuts
2010s Canadian documentary television series
2020s Canadian documentary television series
Aboriginal Peoples Television Network original programming
First Nations television series